Matthew Buckley is a British actor, best known for playing Martin Miller in the BBC school drama Grange Hill from 2001 to 2007.

The Martin character has Asperger syndrome, an autism spectrum disorder. Buckley has worked with the National Autistic Society to promote awareness of autism spectrum disorder.

References

Alumni of the University of Hertfordshire
Autism activists
British male television actors
Living people
Year of birth missing (living people)
British health activists